Claude Frederick Curtin (4 July 1920 – 13 December 1994) was an Australian rules footballer who played with Fitzroy in the VFL.

A full-forward, Curtin was the nephew of former Australian Prime Minister John Curtin. He kicked over fifty goals in a season on four separate occasions, from 1940 to 1942 and in 1946. In each of those seasons he topped Fitzroy's goalkicking. He would have been a member of the club's 1944 premiership side had he not be away on war service.
His grandson is former Hawthorn player and Carlton coach John Barker

References

External links

Maroon and Blue article

1920 births
Fitzroy Football Club players
North Melbourne Football Club players
1994 deaths
Australian rules footballers from Melbourne
People from Brunswick, Victoria
Australian military personnel of World War II
Military personnel from Melbourne